Liberty Nicole Heap (born 16 September 2003) is an English cricketer who currently plays for Lancashire, Cumbria and North West Thunder. An all-rounder, she is a right-handed batter and right-arm off break bowler. She previously played for North Representative XI.

Early life
Heap was born on 16 September 2003 in Burnley, Lancashire.

Domestic career
Heap made her county debut in 2019, for Cumbria against Lincolnshire, in which she scored 17 runs and took 2/23 from 10 overs. This was the only Championship game she played that season, whilst also appearing in two Twenty20 Cup matches. In 2021, Heap was named as part of the Lancashire contingent of the North Representative XI squad for the Twenty20 Cup, playing four matches, scoring 55 runs and taking 2 wickets. She played for Cumbria in the 2022 Women's Twenty20 Cup, taking one wicket.

In 2020, Heap played for North West Thunder in the Rachael Heyhoe Flint Trophy. She appeared in four matches, scoring 28 runs and taking 5 wickets at an average of 18.20. Her best bowling performance came against Lightning, where she took 3/34. She played one match in 2021, scoring 19 and taking 1/41. She played two matches for the side in 2022, both in the Rachael Heyhoe Flint Trophy, taking one wicket as well as hitting 36* from 18 deliveries against Western Storm. In February 2023, it was announced that Heap had signed her first professional contract with North West Thunder.

International career
In October 2022, Heap was selected in the England Under-19 squad for the 2023 ICC Under-19 Women's T20 World Cup. She was ever-present throughout the tournament, scoring 149 runs at an average of 21.28. She made one half-century, scoring 64 from 35 deliveries against Rwanda.

References

External links

2003 births
Living people
Cricketers from Burnley
Cumbria women cricketers
Lancashire women cricketers
North Representative XI cricketers
North West Thunder cricketers